Patrick Winkler (born 2 April 1973) is a retired Swiss football defender.

References

1973 births
Living people
Swiss men's footballers
FC St. Gallen players
SR Delémont players
FC Wil players
Association football defenders
Swiss Super League players